Wszechświęte  is a village in the administrative district of Gmina Oleśnica, within Oleśnica County, Lower Silesian Voivodeship, in south-western Poland. Prior to 1945 it was in Germany.
The village lies approximately 8 kilometers (5 mi) east from Oleśnica.

Organizations 

In the village there are three organizations
 Folk music band "Wianki" ("Wreaths")
 Volunteer fire department
 Football team

Area 

The overall area consists of:
 arable land – 
 meadows – 
 pastures – 
 orchards – 
 built-up areas – 
 forests – 
 water – 
 road – 
 waste land –

Names 

Village has changed names three times over the years:
 1317 – Omnium Sanctorum (Latin for All Saints)
 1376 – Alle Heilig (German: All Saints)
 1785 – Allerheiligen

History

 1317 – first mention. Berold, the parish priest in the village Wszechświęte was mentioned in a document concerning a dispute about tithes
 1376 – village mentioned, as established under German law
 1380 – in the village was a manor owned by Pecko Krompusch
 1597 – the evangelical minister Bartolomeus Glassius was mentioned
 1705 – old church was completely rebuilt (realized by evangelical community)
 1785 – in the village school and folwark began to operate. The village had 143 inhabitants, 3 farmstead farms, 13 farmsteads, 3 cottages
 1819 – Von Hautcharmoi sold his fortune to von Schickfus family
 1845 – the owner of the village was a deputy of the court in Oleśnica – Gustaw Moritz von Schickfus. There were parish, a palace, a windmill, a horse-powered mill in the village. All 27 farms were inhabited by 281 people (3 Catholics, 7 Judaists) of which 15 craftsmen and tradesmen. In the village there was an evangelical school.
 1874 – in the village were 24 farms, inhabited by 149 people (9 Catholics).
 1860 – building of the palace, and establishment of the park
 1876 – estate was owned by Hermann von Wiessel. The estate covered  of land
 1891 – the next owner of the estate was Dr. Phil Kurt Seidler
 1908 – village had 30 houses, 189 inhabitants (23 Catholics)
 1909 – the property was in the hands of the lawyer and deputy district, Wilhelm Krüger. The owner also had a distillery and sugar factory. This state lasted until 1945
 after 1945 – the property was parceled out between the individual users

References

Villages in Oleśnica County